Fast Layne is an American comedy television series created by Travis Braun that aired on Disney Channel from February 15 to March 31, 2019. The series stars Sophie Pollono, Sofia Rosinsky, Brandon Rossel, and Winslow Fegley.

Premise 
In the town of Cedarville, Layne Reed is a brilliant girl whose parents Cheryl and Rob are away so her aunt came to her house to watch over her. While working in a school campaign against her rival Jasper Marr at Cedarville Middle School, she and her friend Zora Morris stumble upon an intelligent car named VIN who is pursued by some people led by Kwon and Riggins. When Layne gets her DNA sequenced with VIN, she becomes the car's operator.

Cast and characters

Main 
 Sophie Pollono as Layne Reed, a brilliant girl who discovers VIN in her parents shed while running for school president
 Sofia Rosinsky as Zora Morris, Layne's homeschooled neighbor and best friend
 Brandon Rossel as Cody Castillo, a boy from school who works at a garage and Layne's love interest
 Winslow Fegley as Mel, Layne's cousin who is trying to find out what Layne and Zora are up to

Recurring 
 Nate Torrence as the voice of VIN, an intelligent car who was created by Layne's parents and his name is short for Vehicle Integrated Neurotech
 Diana Bang as Kwon, a scientist and former co-worker of Cheryl at Salton Flats Technical Command Center who targets VIN after she was kicked off the project for having plans to weaponize VIN
 Enid-Raye Adams as Cheryl, a scientist and mother of Layne who works for the government at Salton Flats Technical Command Center
 David Milchard as Rob, a scientist and father of Layne who works for the government at Salton Flats Technical Command Center
 Michael Adamthwaite as Riggins, the accomplice of Kwon who targets VIN
 Caitlin Howden as Aunt Betty, the aunt of Layne and mother of Mel who is enlisted to watch over Layne while Cheryl and Rob are away.
 Reese Alexander as Principal Mugbee, the principal of Cedarville Middle School
 Ty Consiglio as Jasper, a boy who is Layne's rival in Cedarville Middle School's school election

Notable guest stars 
 Anna Cathcart as Anna, a classmate of Layne
 Adrian Petriw as Alonzo, the sentient wristwatch worn by Layne that notifies her of the things on her schedule

Production 
The series was originally reported in 2017 as a reboot of the Herbie franchise in development for Disney XD; created by Travis Braun, and to be executive produced by Zeke and Luthers Matt Dearborn and Tom Burkhard. The project was later green-lit as a limited series for Disney Channel titled Fast Layne on March 9, 2018, without any reference to the Herbie works. The series comes from Lakeshore Productions. The production's director is Hasraf Dulull, while Brian Hamilton and Travis Braun serve as additional executive producers and Ian Hay serves as producer. Braun also created the series.

It was filmed in Maple Ridge, British Columbia, in the Greater Vancouver area; production began on February 19, 2018, with the final day of filming scheduled for April 27, 2018. The series had a special premiere on Disney Channel on February 15, 2019, immediately following the premiere of the live-action Kim Possible film, before settling in its regular timeslot, starting February 17, 2019. The series comprises eight episodes.

Episodes

Ratings 
 
}}

References

External links 
 

2010s American children's comedy television series
2019 American television series debuts
2019 American television series endings
Disney Channel original programming
English-language television shows
Television shows filmed in British Columbia